Epialtidae is a family of crabs, containing the subfamilies:

 Epialtinae MacLeay, 1838
 Pisinae Dana, 1851
 Pliosomatinae Števčić, 1994
 Tychinae Dana, 1851
 Actinotocarcininae

References

Majoidea
Decapod families